Arenarba destituta is a moth of the family Noctuidae first described by Frederic Moore in 1884. It is found in Sri Lanka, South Africa and New Zealand.

References

Moths of Asia
Moths described in 1884
Acontiinae